The National Competitiveness Council of Nigeria (NCCN) is a private-public non-profit organisation in Nigeria . The council's mandate is to improve the attractiveness of Nigeria’s economy as a place to do business in the global marketplace.
The Council's operations are largely driven by the private sector, with government playing a supportive and enabling role. The Council serves as a nexus for the dialogue between business, trade unions, regulatory organisations, academia, international development organisations, think tanks, media and the Nigerian Government. The outcome of this dialogue is actionable recommendations and an implementation strategy for policies that will improve competitiveness and collective prosperity for Nigeria's citizens.

History
The Council was inaugurated by His Excellency  Goodluck E. Jonathan on 4 February 2013. Former bank executive Matthias Chika Mordi was appointed as the inaugural chief executive officer.

Structure
The Council is chaired by the incumbent Minister of Trade and Investment. The position of vice-chair is held by an appointed private sector leader. The CEO heads the secretariat in charge of the council's executive and administrative tracks.

Current membership
Membership on the council is by presidential appointment in consultation with the acting Minister of Trade and Investment.

List of members
Dr. Olusegun Aganga- NCCN Chairman - Hon Minister, Federal Ministry of Industry, Trade and Investments
Tony O. Elumelu- NCCN Vice-chairman - Founder, The Tony Elumelu Foundation
Chika Mordi- NCCN CEO - Chairman, UBA Capital
Alhaji Aliko Dangote - Founder Dangote Group
Prof Austin Esogbue - Professor and Director Emeritus School of Industrial and Systems Engineering Georgia Institute of Technology, Atlanta, Georgia
Austin Okere - Group CEO, Computer Warehouse Group
Bola Adesola - Managing Director/CEO, Standard Chartered Bank of Nigeria
Frank Aibogun - Publisher, Business Day (Nigeria) Newspaper
Frank Nweke II - Director General, Nigerian Economic Summit Group
Dr. Issac Okemini - AMC Consulting
Chief Kola Jamodu - President, Manufacturers Association of Nigeria
Dr. Nwnanze Okidigbe - Chief Economic Advisor to the President
Omobola Johnson - Hon. Minister, Federal Ministry of Communication Technology
Dr. Saad Usman - Director, (Osprey Investments) Emir of Jere
Dr. Obadiah Mailafia - Chef de Cabinet ACP Group of States Brussels Belgium
Oba Nsugbe QC, SAN - Joint Head of Pump Court Chambers
Yvonne Ike - Chief Executive Officer, Renaissance Capital West Africa

Advisers to the Council
A cross-section of respected global and Nigerian institutions;.

Professor Michael Porter of the Harvard Institute for Strategy and Competitiveness
Baroness Lynda Chalker of the Honorary International Investors Council
Dr. Juan E. Pardinas, Director, of the Mexican Institute for Competitiveness
Dr. Wiebe Boer of The Tony Elumelu Foundation

Activities

Working groups
The NCCN initiated four working groups. The working groups draw membership from the NCCN council, the Nigerian private sector, international development bodies and consulting firms. The working groups are set up to develop recommendations and facilitate the implementation of changes to improve Nigeria’s competitiveness and performance in global rankings.

National and Sub-National Report
The National Competitiveness Council of Nigeria’s (NCCN) “National Competitiveness Report” will expand on the framework and methodology used in the World Economic Forum’s – Global Competitiveness Report and the World Bank’s – Doing business report to provide insight into the challenges to improved competitiveness and assess the regulation surrounding the ease with which businesses are able to set up and operate in Nigeria.
The hope is that these reports will focus discourse around competitiveness issues and provide a platform for policy changes that will result in increased competitiveness.

References

Business organizations based in Nigeria